Messaoudi (in Arabic مسعودي) is a surname. Notable people with the name include:

Ahmed El Messaoudi (born 1995), Moroccan footballer
Aïssa Messaoudi, nom de guerre Tayeb el-Afghani, was an Algerian Islamist. He fought in the Afghan War. He launched an attack on the Guemmar barracks in 1991, before the start of the Algerian Civil War proper; sometimes considered to mark the beginning of the Armed Islamic Movement (MIA)
Ali Messaoudi (born 1995), Algerian steeplechase runner
Billel Messaoudi (born 1997), Algerian footballer
Kamel Messaoudi (1961–1998), Algerian Chaabi music performer
Khalida Messaoudi or Khalida Toumi (born 1958), Algerian politician 
Mehdi Messaoudi (born 1989), French-Moroccan footballer 
Mehdi Messaoudi (wrestler) (born 1990), Moroccan Greco-Roman wrestler.
Mohamed Messaoudi (born 1973), Tunisian handball player

See also
Masudi